Dactyloscopus poeyi, the shortchin stargazer, is a species of sand stargazer native to the coasts of the Bahamas, the Antilles and the Caribbean coast of Central and South America from Belize to Venezuela. It can reach a maximum length of  SL. The specific name honours the Cuban ichthyologist Felipe Poey (1799-1891).

References

poeyi
Taxa named by Theodore Gill
Fish described in 1861